The Superior Catholic Herald is a Catholic bi-weekly newspaper, and is the official publication of the Diocese of Superior. It was established as The Catholic Herald Citizen by Bishop Albert Meyer, starting in 1953.

References

External links
 

Catholic newspapers published in the United States
Newspapers established in 1953
Newspapers published in Wisconsin
Roman Catholic Diocese of Superior
1953 establishments in Wisconsin